Events in the year 2013 in Eritrea.

Incumbents 

 President: Isaias Afewerki

Events 

 21 January – A group of a soldiers from the national army seized the headquarters of the state broadcaster EriTV and allegedly broadcast a message demanding reforms and the release of political prisoners.

Deaths

References 

 
2010s in Eritrea
Years of the 21st century in Eritrea
Eritrea
Eritrea